is a football (soccer) club based in Wakayama, the capital city of Wakayama Prefecture in Japan. They play in the Kansai Soccer League, which is part of Japanese Regional Leagues. The name Arterivo comes from the combination of two Italian words: arte, meaning "art", and arrivo, meaning "arrival".

History
They started with 30 volunteers to establish a J. League club: their final goal started in July 2007, when Arterivo Wakayama was officially registered as a football club. From 2008, Arterivo started climbing the Japanese football pyramid, reaching Kansai Soccer League in 2011, while getting their spot in Division 1 just the next season. They won Kansai Soccer League both in 2015 and 2016, but they're still waiting for a Japan Football League promotion.

During the years, Arterivo faced different Emperor's Cup matches: out of fourteen attempts, they progressed to the second round or further, on three occasions.

League & cup record 

Key

Honours
Wakayama Prefecture 
Division 3 Champions 2008
Division 2 Champions 2009
Division 1 Champions 2010

Kansai Soccer League
Champions (2): 2015, 2016
Shakaijin Cup:  2015

Current squad

References

External links
Official Site (Japanese)

 
Football clubs in Japan
Sport in Wakayama Prefecture
Wakayama (city)
Association football clubs established in 2007
2007 establishments in Japan